Nseluka is a small town in northern Zambia. It is on the M1 road, which heads to Kasama in the south and Mbala/Mpulungu in the north.

Statistics 
 elevation –

Transport 
It has a station on the TAZARA railway.  It is the proposed junction for a branch railway to Mpulungu on the shores of Lake Tanganyika.

See also 
 Transport in Zambia

References 

Populated places in Zambia